Takahama can refer to:

Places
 Takahama, Aichi, a city in Aichi Prefecture, Japan
 Takahama, Fukui, a town in Fukui Prefecture, Japan

People

 Aiko Takahama, women's professional shogi player
 Kyoshi Takahama (1874 – 1959), a Japanese writer  
 Takahama Tatsurō (b. 1976), former fighting name Japanese sumo wrestler now known as Hamanishiki Tatsurō